Dansez pentru tine returned for its thirteenth season on October 26, 2012. Ștefan Bănică, Jr. and Iulia Vântur returned as hosts. The judges are Mihai Petre, Wilmark Rizzo, Emilia Popescu, Beatrice Rancea and Cornel Patrichi was replaced with Edi Stancu.

Couples
The 8 celebrities and professional dancers who competed were:

Scoring chart

Red numbers indicate the lowest score for each week
Green numbers indicate the highest score for each week
 the couple eliminated that week
 the returning couple finishing in the bottom two (or three)
 the returning couple that was the last to be called safe
 the winning couple
 the runner-up couple
 the third-place couple

Weekly scores and songs

Week 1
Running order
Part I (Harap-Alb freestyle)

Part II (Waltz)

Week 2
Running order
Part I (Rock 'n' Roll)

Part II

Bottom two

Dance chart 
The celebrities and professional partners danced one of these routines for each corresponding week:
 Week 1:  Freestyle and Waltz

 Highest scoring dance
 Lowest scoring dance
 Danced, but not scored

Ratings

External links
Official website

References

Season 13
2012 Romanian television seasons